The Hottest 100 Australian Albums of All Time is a listener-voted countdown of albums run by Australian radio station Triple J in June and July 2011. In May 2011, Triple J music director Richard Kingsmill announced that the station would be conducting another special Triple J Hottest 100 listener-voted poll the following month, counting down the best 100 albums by Australian artists. Voting began on 6 June, and concluded on the evening of 26 June. The countdown was carried out over two weeks, starting on 28 June 2011, and finishing at 5pm on 10 July, with Brisbane band Powderfinger's 2000 album, Odyssey Number Five (which contained two Hottest 100 winning tracks; "These Days" in 1999 and "My Happiness" in 2000), announced at No. 1. During the countdown, selected tracks were played from selected albums, with some other albums being aired in full, including each of the albums to make the top twenty.

List

Artists with multiple entries
Five entries
Silverchair (2, 22, 27, 43, 70)
Bernard Fanning (Once solo and four times with Powderfinger) (1, 6, 14, 41, 54)

Four entries
Powderfinger (1, 6, 14, 41)
Ian Kenny (Twice with Karnivool and twice with Birds of Tokyo) (30, 32, 39, 45)

Three entries
Grinspoon (12, 58, 99)
Hilltop Hoods (16, 23, 85)
Midnight Oil (21, 33, 55)
John Butler Trio (24, 53, 63)
Paul Dempsey (Once solo and twice with Something for Kate) (94, 40, 72)

Two entries
AC/DC (3, 73)
The Presets (7, 71)
Regurgitator (10, 44)
Crowded House (13, 18)
You Am I (26, 35)
The Cat Empire (28, 100)
Karnivool (30, 45)
Angus & Julia Stone (31, 38)
Birds of Tokyo (32, 39)
Something for Kate (40, 72)
Cold Chisel (42, 65)
Eskimo Joe (47, 87)
Nick Cave and the Bad Seeds (52, 98)
Sarah Blasko (59, 74)
Bliss n Eso (66, 67)
Pendulum (61, 77)
The Butterfly Effect (88, 97)
Nick Littlemore (Once with Pnau and once with Empire of the Sun) (89, 46)
Luke Steele (Once with The Sleepy Jackson and once with Empire of the Sun) (78, 46)

Albums by decade
1970s - 4
1980s - 11
1990s - 21
2000s - 53
2010s - 11

References

External links 
 Triple J Hottest 100 Australians Albums of all time

2011 in Australian music
Australia Triple J Hottest 100 Albums
2011 All time